Ernest Edmonds (born 1942, London, England) is a British artist, a pioneer in the field of computer art and its variants, algorithmic art, generative art, interactive art, from the late 1960s to the present. His work is represented in the Victoria and Albert Museum, as part of the National Archive of Computer-Based Art and Design.

Life and work
Ernest Edmonds is an international expert on Human-Computer Interaction who specialises in creative technologies for creative uses. He was one of the first to predict the value of iterative design and a very early advocate of iterative design methods and Agile software development. He founded the ACM Creativity and Cognition Conference series and was part of the founding team for the ACM Intelligent User Interface conference series.

Edmonds studied Mathematics and Philosophy at Leicester University. He has a PhD in logic from the University of Nottingham, is a Fellow of the British Computer Society, and a Fellow of the Institution of Engineering and Technology. He has nearly 300 refereed publications in the fields of human-computer interaction, creativity and art and was a pioneer in the development of practice-based PhD programmes. Ernest Edmonds is Professor of Computation and Creative Media at the University of Technology Sydney and Professor of Computational Art at De Montfort University, Leicester, UK. He is a cousin of Philip Bunker.

Art
Edmonds’ art is in the constructivist tradition and he first used computers in his art practice in 1968. He first showed an interactive work with Stroud Cornock in 1970. He first showed a generative time-based computer work in London in 1985. He has exhibited throughout the world, from Moscow to LA. The Victoria and Albert Museum, London, holds some of his artwork and is collecting his archives within the National Archive of Computer Based Art and Design.

In 2014, Edmonds curated a seminal historical exhibition, Automatic Art, at GV art gallery, London.
The show included works by Harold Cohen, Anthony Hill, Malcolm Hughes, Michael Kidner, William Latham, Kenneth Martin, Mary Martin, Jeffrey Steele, Sean Clark and Susan Tebby.

Selected exhibitions
 2017 
Ernest Edmonds, De Montfort University Gallery Leicester UK
Constructs, Colour, Code: Ernest Edmonds 1967–2017
 2013
Ernest Edmonds, Conny Dietzschold Gallery, Sydney
Transformations: Digital Prints from the V&A collection, Royal Brompton Hospital, UK
 2012/3
Light Logic. Site Gallery, Sheffield, UK 
Selected New Acquisitions. Victoria and Albert Museum, London
 2012
Intuition and Integrity, Kinetica, London; Lighthouse, Brighton; Lovebytes, Sheffield, Phoenix, Leicester
Transformations: Digital Prints from the V&A collection, Great Western Hospital, Swindon, UK
Visualise Poetry, Language, Code, Cambridge, UK
 2010
Grid Gallery, Vivid festival, Sydney
 2009
When Ideas Become Form—20 Years, Conny Dietzschold Gallery, Sydney
Cities Tango, Conny Dietzschold Gallery, Sydney and ISEA, Belfast
 2007
Ernest Edmonds and Alf Loehr, Conny Dietzschold Gallery, Sydney
Speculative Data and the Creative Imaginary, National Academy of Sciences Gallery, Washington DC
ColorField Remix, WPA\C Experimental Media Series (performance), Corcoran Gallery of Art, Washington DC
 2005
White Noise, Australian Centre for the Moving Image, Melbourne
Ernest Edmonds and David Thomas, Conny Dietzschold Gallery, Sydney
Minimal Approach… Concrete Tendencies, Tin Sheds Gallery, University of Sydney
 2004
Australian Concrete Constructive Art, Conny Dietzschold Gallery, Sydney
SIGGRAPH Art Exhibition, Los Angeles
GRAPHITE Art Exhibition, Singapore
Sonar2004Festival, Barcelona
 2000
Global Echos. Mondriaanhuis, Amersfoort
Constructs & Reconstructions, Loughborough University 
2000: Relativities, Bankside Gallery, London, and tour
 1999
Galerie Jean-Mark Laik, Koblenz
Science in the Arts—Arts in Science, Hungarian Academy of Fine Arts, Budapest
 1994
Digital Arts, The Mall Gallery, London
Friends of Mesures. Vervier and Antwerp
 1990
SISEA, Groningen—collaborative performance
Avant Garde 1990, Manege, Moscow
Art Creating Society. Museum of Modern Art, Oxford
Heads and Legs. Liege (one-person) including a collaborative performance
 1989
Constructivism versus Computer. Galerie FARO, World Trade Centre, Rotterdam
Re-Views: Contemporary systematic and constructive arts. The Small Mansion Arts Centre, London
 1988
Null-Dimension. Galerie New Space, Fulda (and 1989, Gmunden, Austria)
 1985
Duality and Co-existence. Exhibiting Space, London (one-person).
 1975
2nd International Drawing Biennale. Middlesbrough Art Gallery, Cleveland, and tour
 1972
Cognition and Control. Midland Group Gallery, Nottingham

References

Bibliography

External links
 Ernest Edmonds website
 List of Edmonds' works held by the Victoria and Albert Museum
 Ernest Edmonds' page at Digital Art Museum
 Ernest A. Edmond, Database of Digital Art
 Ernest Edmonds, Artnet
 Ernest Edmonds – Leonardo Electronic Almanac
 Ernest Edmonds, Institute of Creative Technologies (IOCT), School of Media and Communication, De Montfort University, UK
Oral History Interview with Ernest Alan Edmonds (2021). Charles Babbage Institute. Retrieved from the University of Minnesota Digital Conservancy.

1942 births
Living people
20th-century English male artists
21st-century English male artists
Academics of De Montfort University
Artists from London
Alumni of the University of Leicester
Alumni of the University of Nottingham
British digital artists
Fellows of the British Computer Society
Fellows of the Institution of Engineering and Technology
Academic staff of the University of Technology Sydney